HK Novi Sad was an ice hockey club from Novi Sad, Serbia. It played its home games at SPENS, located in Novi Sad.

HK Novi Sad was founded in 1998 and stopped competing in 2009 due to economic reasons.

Honours

Serbian Hockey League:
Runners-up (3): 1999, 2003, 2008

Ice hockey teams in Serbia
Serbian Hockey League teams
Sport in Novi Sad
Panonian League teams
Ice hockey clubs established in 1998
1998 establishments in Serbia